Esteio is a municipality situated in the Brazilian state of Rio Grande do Sul, in the metropolitan region of Porto Alegre, the state capital. About 9.3 miles from Porto Alegre, and neighboring Canoas and Sapucaia do Sul, it has about 83,000 inhabitants.

Esteio is known for being the city where the Expointer takes place. Expointer is one of the most important agriculture/farming fairs of South America.

References

External links
 Esteio Mayoral Office (Portuguese)

Municipalities in Rio Grande do Sul